Coward is a town in Florence County, South Carolina, United States. The population was 752 at the 2010 census, up from 650 in 2000. It is part of the Florence Metropolitan Statistical Area.

Geography
U.S. Route 52 runs through the center of town, leading north  to Florence, the county seat, and south  to Lake City. South Carolina Highway 541 leads west from Coward  to Olanta.

The town is in the watershed of the Lynches River, a tributary of the Pee Dee River.

Demographics

As of the census of 2000, there were 650 people, 246 households, and 178 families residing in the town. The population density was 189.9 people per square mile (73.4/km2). There were 263 housing units at an average density of 76.8 per square mile (29.7/km2). The racial makeup of the town was 84.15% White, 14.00% African American, 0.15% Asian, 0.62% from other races, and 1.08% from two or more races. Hispanic or Latino of any race were 1.38% of the population.

There were 246 households, out of which 32.9% had children under the age of 18 living with them, 56.1% were married couples living together, 12.2% had a female householder with no husband present, and 27.6% were non-families. 24.8% of all households were made up of individuals, and 8.1% had someone living alone who was 65 years of age or older. The average household size was 2.64 and the average family size was 3.17.

In the town, the population was spread out, with 26.2% under the age of 18, 9.7% from 18 to 24, 28.8% from 25 to 44, 25.5% from 45 to 64, and 9.8% who were 65 years of age or older. The median age was 35 years. For every 100 females, there were 98.8 males. For every 100 females age 18 and over, there were 94.3 males.

The median income for a household in the town was $28,182, and the median income for a family was $30,208. Males had a median income of $28,977 versus $17,039 for females. The per capita income for the town was $12,711. About 16.1% of families and 24.4% of the population were below the poverty line, including 37.2% of those under age 18 and 43.2% of those age 65 or over.

References

External links
 Government Information from Florence County

Towns in Florence County, South Carolina
Towns in South Carolina
Florence, South Carolina metropolitan area